Sisterhood of the Squared Circle: The History and Rise of Women's Wrestling is a 2017 book about the history of women's professional wrestling. The book was written by wrestling historian Pat Laprade.

References

Women's professional wrestling
Professional wrestling books
2017 non-fiction books
Canadian non-fiction books
ECW Press books